This document describes the CGA's hierarchy structure and the tools they used each school year in ICT schools.

School year 2003–04 
During the school year 2003-2004, the Andalusian Government opened 100 ICT schools in Andalusia as a pilot experience.
 50 ICT schools for e-Government
 50 ICT schools for educational process
 A total of 18.000 PCs

Tools that they used:
 Cheops
 Bugzilla
 Nagios
 MRTG

Hierarchy structure of the staff:

School year 2004–05 
 150 schools for e-Government
 150 schools for educational process
 A total of 58.000 PCs

Software that CGA used during this school year:
 Cheops
 Nagios
 MRTG
 Sigila (self-made: Sistema Integral de Gestión de Incidencias y Localización de Averias or Integral System to Manage and Localize system's Breakdowns)
 Unattended Operating System installations 
PXE
SystemImager
 Tools to share and security
NFS
LDAP
rsync

School year 2005–06 
 618 for the two purpose (for e-Government and for educational process)
 A total of 105.000 PCs

CGA omitted the use of this software tools because they were not useful for a big Network with 105.000 PC:
 Cheops
 Nagios
 MRTG

Control software tools:
 Sigila
 Unattended installations of the Operating System
PXE
SystemImager
 Tools to share and security
NFS
LDAP
RSYNC
 Unattended software installations:
CFEngine
 Munin
 Visco (self-made, this is Nagios' adaptation for a bigger network)

Software to be used at the schools
 Apagado remoto de equipos (Remote shutdown for all PC in the ICT School)
 CRV (Cañón de red virtual or Virtual Network Projector)
 iTALC

School year 2006–07 
 1.100 ICT Schools
 185.000 PC

Human and technical resource are difficult to scalar, then, the CGA needed to design a new solution 
to reach two objectives:

 Control, management and flexibility
 To control the grown of human and technical resources

To reach these objectives CGA used ITIL

Related links 
Centro de Gestión Avanzado de Centros TIC 
https://web.archive.org/web/20070717170623/http://www.cga.org.es/blog/ 
http://www.guadalinex.org

See also 
CGA (Advanced Management Centre)

Education in Spain
Free software culture and documents
Governmental educational technology organizations